"Moto Psycho" is a song by the American thrash metal band Megadeth. It was released in 2001 as the lead single from their ninth studio album, The World Needs a Hero. A music video for the song was made, directed by  Nathan Cox.

Background 
The song is about people who commute every day to work, spending a lot of time on the road. It has been played 67 times live by the band.

A music video was made for the song. As of November 2022, the music video hasn't been uploaded on the Megadeth YouTube channel, but it has been uploaded by a fan.

Track listing

Personnel 
Production and performance credits are adapted from the album liner notes, except where otherwise noted.

Megadeth
 Dave Mustaine – guitars, lead vocals
 David Ellefson – bass, backing vocals
 Jimmy DeGrasso – drums
 Al Pitrelli – guitars, backing vocals

Production
Produced by Dave Mustaine; Co-produced by Bill Kennedy
Mixed and engineered by Bill Kennedy
Assistant engineers – Mark Valentine, Lance Dean, Jay Goin, Greg Edenfield
Pro Tools – Chris Vrenna, Joe Bishara, James Murray, Sean Dever, Ken Mary, Lance Dean
Digital editing – Chris Vrenna
Mastered by Tom Jensen

Charts

References 

2001 songs
2001 singles
Megadeth songs
Songs written by Dave Mustaine